Vaippar is a village panchyat in Tuticorin district, Tamil Nadu, India. A famous dargah where the grave of Shamsuddeen Shaheed a minister of Badusha Sulthan Syed Ibrahim Shaheed of Erwadi is found here.

References

Sufi shrines in India
Ziyarat
Dargahs in Tamil Nadu
Erwadi-related dargahs